Ballrechten-Dottingen is a municipality in Markgräflerland in the southwest of Germany. It is situated at the western edge of Black Forest.

References

External links

Gemeinde Ballrechten-Dottingen (German)

Breisgau-Hochschwarzwald
Baden